The Fishery Limits Act 1976 is an Act of the Parliament of the United Kingdom (1977 c. 86) in order to implement the extension of fishing waters under the European Community's Common Fisheries Policy into British law.

Iceland, with whom the United Kingdom had clashed over fishing rights in the so-called "Cod War", was not included due to separate negotiations with the EEC.

See also
Fisheries Act

External links

News coverage  
 Fight for fishing rights in Europe, BBC News items

UK Legislation 

United Kingdom Acts of Parliament 1976
1976 in the environment
1976 in law
Fisheries law
Fishing in the United Kingdom